The Seraturi or Serratura (in Italian, meaning "lock") were a noble family of the Republic of Ragusa.

References

Sources

Ragusan noble families